Nordmann's birch mouse (Sicista loriger) is a species of birch mouse in the family Sminthidae. It is named after Finnish biologist Alexander von Nordmann. It is native to eastern and southeastern Europe.

Taxonomy 
It was long thought to be a subspecies of the southern birch mouse (S. subtilis), but a 2016 study found sufficient genetic and anatomical divergence for it to be considered its own species.

Distribution 
It is restricted to the western portion of the Pontic–Caspian steppe, where it is known only from a few isolated populations in southern Ukraine, west Belgorod in Russia, and eastern Romania. In addition, it may potentially be found in Bulgaria and Moldova.

Status 
This species has a fragmented distribution due to its reliance on the largely developed steppe habitat. Populations in these fragmented regions also face ongoing threats from development and agriculture. Due to this, this species is classified as Vulnerable by the IUCN Red List.

References 

Sicista
Fauna of Ukraine
Mammals of Russia
Fauna of Romania
Fauna of Bulgaria
Fauna of Moldova
Vulnerable biota of Europe
Mammals described in 1840